Talakadu Srinivasaiah Nagabharana (born 23 January 1953), commonly known as T. S. Nagabharana, is an Indian film director, in the Kannada film industry and a pioneer of parallel cinema. He is one of the few film directors to have straddled the mainstream and parallel cinema worlds.

Early life

T S Nagabharana was born on 23 January 1953 at Talakadu, Mysuru district, Karnataka. He completed  his education at a corporation school in Chamarajpet. He has been an administrator for several theatre repertories, especially Rangayana, Mysuru and Benaka Theatre Group, Bengaluru. He has produced and directed number of serials and other programs for Doordarshan and other channels. 

His movie Mysore Mallige was an inspiration for 1942: A Love Story. The core plot of Chigurida Kanasu was an inspiration for Swades. The movie Nagamandala was an inspiration for Paheli. The core plot of Kallarali Hoovagi was an inspiration for the storyline of  Bajrangi Bhaijaan.

He has been the recipient of international, national, state and other awards for 20 of his 34 Kannada movies in the last 40 years. He was nominated as the chairman of Karnataka Chalanachitra Academy (KCA), Bangalore [Government of Karnataka] (State Film Academy). Currently he is the Chairman of Kannada Development Authority of Govt of Karnataka.

Career
He directed and acted in plays like Sangya Balya, Kathale Belaku, Shakarana Sarotu, Jokumaraswamy, Oedipus, Sattavara Neralu, Krishna Parijata, Tingara Buddanna, Mundena Sakhi Mundena, Hayavadana, Neegikonda Samsa, Baka and Blood Wedding.

He received a gold medal from the Government of India for his achievement in theatre. He is the founder of a theatre organisation called Benaka. He also started Shruthalaya, an organisation for organising, writing, composing, camera work, lighting, art, acting, editing and directing.

As director

As actor

Achievements
Nagabharana has won nine National and 14 State awards.

Awards and nominations

National Film Awards

Karnataka State Awards

Filmfare Awards South

Others
 Dhwani- Sriranga international Kannada theatre award for 2009 by Dhwani Pratishthana

References

External links
 

Kannada film directors
1953 births
Living people
Indian documentary filmmakers
20th-century Indian film directors
Male actors in Kannada cinema
Indian male film actors
Filmfare Awards South winners
Film directors from Bangalore
Male actors from Bangalore
20th-century Indian male actors
21st-century Indian male actors
21st-century Indian film directors
Best Original Screenplay National Film Award winners
Directors who won the Best Film on National Integration National Film Award
Recipients of the Rajyotsava Award 2003